Andre Begemann (born 12 July 1984) is a German inactive professional tennis player. He is a doubles specialist who reached his career-high doubles ranking of world No. 36, achieved in May 2015. He has a career-high singles ranking of No. 166, achieved in July 2010.

Begemann has won four doubles titles on the ATP Tour in his career.

Doubles performance timeline

ATP career finals

Doubles: 11 (4 titles, 7 runner-ups)

ATP Challenger and ITF Futures finals

Singles: 11 (9–2)

Doubles: 58 (38–20)

External links
 
 
 
 
 

1984 births
Living people
German male tennis players
Tennis people from North Rhine-Westphalia
21st-century German people